The Bandmaster is a 1930 short animated film distributed by Columbia Pictures, and one of the long-running cartoons featuring Krazy Kat. In a reissue print by Samba Pictures, the film is simply presented as Bandmaster.

Plot
At a domed platform at a park, a pack of musicians gathered, and Krazy is their conductor. Krazy, for some reason, puts on a Guy Fawkes mask before playing Stars and Stripes Forever. Halfway through the music, a trumpeter is having some problems playing. But instead of reprimanding the trumpeter, the feline maestro courteously gives that player encouragement to perform better. The melody resumes better this time, and upon completion, Krazy proudly takes off his mask.

Krazy and his orchestra then perform Twelfth Street Rag. Moments after starting, he mysteriously transforms into Paul Whiteman, then Charlie Chaplin, then Ted Lewis playing a clarinet, and finally Ben Turpin playing a trombone. After the scene shifts to some surroundings, Krazy is shown conducting as himself again. Everybody within the vicinity of the platform dances to the tune, including a statue of a cavalry man on a horse which both become animated.

Reception
MPN commented "Another reason why these clever cartoons are so popular."

See also
 Krazy Kat filmography

References

External links
The Bandmaster at the Big Cartoon Database
 

1930 films
American animated short films
American black-and-white films
1930 animated films
Krazy Kat shorts
Films about shapeshifting
Columbia Pictures short films
1930s American animated films
Columbia Pictures animated short films
Screen Gems short films